The Rome Convention for the Protection of Performers, Producers of Phonograms and Broadcasting Organisations also known as the International Convention for the Protection of Performers, Producers of Phonograms and Broadcasting Organisations and the Rome Convention, 496 U.N.T.S 43, was accepted by members of the United International Bureaux for the Protection of Intellectual Property (BIRPI), the predecessor to the modern World Intellectual Property Organization, on 26 October 1961. The Diplomatic Conference was jointly convened by BIRPI, the International Labour Organisation, and the United Nations Educational, Scientific and Cultural Organization. The agreement extended copyright related rights protection for the first time to entities or individuals who are not the author but have a close relationship to a copyrighted work, including performers, sound recording producers and broadcasting organizations. As of August 2021, the treaty has 96 contracting parties, with a party defined as a State which has consented to be bound by the treaty and for which the treaty is in force.

Nations drew up the Convention in response to new technologies like tape recorders that made the reproduction of sounds and images easier and cheaper than ever before.  Whereas earlier copyright law, including international agreements like the 1886 Berne Convention, had been written to regulate the circulation of printed materials, the Rome Convention responded to the new circumstance of ideas variously represented in easily reproduced units by covering performers and producers of recordings under copyright:

 Performers (actors, singers, musicians, dancers and other persons who perform literary or artistic works) are protected against certain acts they have not consented to. Such acts are: the broadcasting and the communication to the public of their live performance; the fixation of their live performance; the reproduction of such a fixation if the original fixation was made without their consent or if the reproduction is made for purposes different from those for which they gave their consent.
 Producers of phonograms enjoy the right to authorise or prohibit the direct or indirect reproduction of their phonograms. Phonograms are defined in the Rome Convention as meaning any exclusively aural fixation of sounds of a performance or of other sounds. When a phonogram published for commercial purposes gives rise to secondary uses (such as broadcasting or communication to the public in any form), a single equitable remuneration must be paid by the user to the performers, or to the producers of phonograms, or to both; contracting States are free, however, not to apply this rule or to limit its application.
 Broadcasting organisations enjoy the right to authorise or prohibit certain acts, namely: the rebroadcasting of their broadcasts; the fixation of their broadcasts; the reproduction of such fixations; the communication to the public of their television broadcasts if such communication is made in places accessible to the public against payment of an entrance fee.

The Rome Convention allows the following exceptions in national laws to the above-mentioned rights:

 private use
 use of short excerpts in connection with the reporting of current events
 ephemeral fixation by a broadcasting organisation by means of its own facilities and for its own broadcasts
 use solely for the purpose of teaching or scientific research
 in any other cases—except for compulsory licenses that would be incompatible with the Berne Convention—where the national law provides exceptions to copyright in literary and artistic works.

Furthermore, once a performer has consented to the incorporation of his performance in a visual or audiovisual fixation, the provisions on performers' rights have no further application.

See also 
 Geneva Phonograms Convention
 List of parties to the Rome Convention for the Protection of Performers, Producers of Phonograms and Broadcasting Organisations

References

External links 

  International Convention for the Protection of Performers, Producers of Phonograms and Broadcasting Organisations at the United Nations Treaty Collection
 Summary of the Rome Convention for the Protection of Performers, Producers of Phonograms and Broadcasting Organisations in the WIPO Lex database – official website of WIPO.
 The full text of the Rome Convention for the Protection of Performers, Producers of Phonograms and Broadcasting Organisations  in the WIPO Lex database – official website of WIPO.

World Intellectual Property Organization treaties
1961 in Italy
Treaties concluded in 1961
Treaties entered into force in 1964
Treaties of Albania
Treaties of Algeria
Treaties of Andorra
Treaties of Argentina
Treaties of Armenia
Treaties of Australia
Treaties of Austria
Treaties of Azerbaijan
Treaties of Bahrain
Treaties of Barbados
Treaties of Belarus
Treaties of Belize
Treaties of Belgium
Treaties of Bolivia
Treaties of Bosnia and Herzegovina
Treaties of the military dictatorship in Brazil
Treaties of Bulgaria
Treaties of Burkina Faso
Treaties of Canada
Treaties of Cape Verde
Treaties of Chile
Treaties of Colombia
Treaties of the Republic of the Congo
Treaties of Costa Rica
Treaties of Croatia
Treaties of Cyprus
Treaties of the Czech Republic
Treaties of Denmark
Treaties of Dominica
Treaties of the Dominican Republic
Treaties of Ecuador
Treaties of El Salvador
Treaties of Estonia
Treaties of Fiji
Treaties of Finland
Treaties of France
Treaties of Georgia (country)
Treaties of West Germany
Treaties of Greece
Treaties of Guatemala
Treaties of Honduras
Treaties of Hungary
Treaties of Iceland
Treaties of Ireland
Treaties of Israel
Treaties of Italy
Treaties of Jamaica
Treaties of Japan
Treaties of South Korea
Treaties of Kazakhstan
Treaties of Kyrgyzstan
Treaties of Latvia
Treaties of Lebanon
Treaties of Lesotho
Treaties of Liechtenstein
Treaties of Lithuania
Treaties of Luxembourg
Treaties of North Macedonia
Treaties of Mexico
Treaties of Moldova
Treaties of Monaco
Treaties of Montenegro
Treaties of the Netherlands
Treaties of Nicaragua
Treaties of Niger
Treaties of Nigeria
Treaties of Norway
Treaties of Panama
Treaties of Paraguay
Treaties of Peru
Treaties of the Philippines
Treaties of Poland
Treaties of Portugal
Treaties of Qatar
Treaties of Romania
Treaties of Russia
Treaties of Saint Lucia
Treaties of Serbia and Montenegro
Treaties of Slovakia
Treaties of Slovenia
Treaties of Spain
Treaties of Sweden
Treaties of Switzerland
Treaties of Syria
Treaties of Tajikistan
Treaties of Togo
Treaties of Turkey
Treaties of Ukraine
Treaties of the United Arab Emirates
Treaties of the United Kingdom
Treaties of Uruguay
Treaties of Venezuela
Treaties of Vietnam
Treaties extended to Bermuda
Treaties extended to Gibraltar
Treaties extended to the Isle of Man
Treaties extended to Greenland
Treaties extended to the Faroe Islands
Treaties extended to West Berlin